William Clerke may refer to:

William Clerke (MP) (died 1587), MP for Devizes, Wilton and Calne
William Clerke (writer)
Sir William Clerke, 2nd Baronet (1643–1678), of the Clerke baronets
Sir William Clerke, 3rd Baronet (c. 1662–1699), of the Clerke baronets
Sir William Clerke, 5th Baronet (died c. 1738), of the Clerke baronets
Sir William Clerke, 8th Baronet (1751–1818), of the Clerke baronets
Sir William Henry Clerke, 9th Baronet (1793–1861), of the Clerke baronets
Sir William Henry Clerke, 10th Baronet (1822–1882), of the Clerke baronets
Sir William Francis Clerke, 11th Baronet (1856–1930), of the Clerke baronets

See also
William Clerk (disambiguation)
William Clarke (disambiguation)